Stephen Atako Lindskog (born 16 May 1967) is a Nigerian-Swedish professional golfer.

Lindskog was born in Nigeria and raised in Sweden. He turned professional in 1989 after winning the Spanish Amateur and played on the Swedish Golf Tour. In 1996, he relocated to Jakarta, Indonesia where his parents were based. He joined the Asian Tour and played 104 events between 1996 and 2015 with ten top-10 finishes, reaching an Official World Golf Ranking of 486 in 2000 after winning the Volvo Masters of Malaysia.

Amateur wins
1989 Spanish Amateur

Professional wins (1)

Asian Tour wins (1)

Asian Tour playoff record (1–0)

References

External links

Swedish male golfers
Asian Tour golfers
1967 births
Living people